Jaime Córdoba (born 11 October 1950) is a Curaçaoan politician of the Sovereign People (PS). Between 23 December 2016 and 29 May 2017 he was Minister for Social Development, Work and Welfare. He was a member of the Estates of Curaçao between 2010 and December 2016, and served as Vice-President of the Estates between 2012 and 2015. Since December 2015 Córdoba serves as political leader of Sovereign People. He was leader of the party in the Estates from December 2015 until his appointment as Minister.

Career
Córdoba is a retired policeman, he has been member of the Estates of Curaçao for Sovereign People since the dissolution of the Netherlands Antilles on 10 October 2010. On 2 November 2012 he was elected as Vice-President of the Estates. The same month Córdoba stated that he was offered 2 million Netherlands Antillean guilder to withdraw his support from the government, which was based on 11 of 21 seats of the Estates.

The in May 2013 assassinated leader of Sovereign People, Helmin Wiels, saw Córdoba as a future candidate for a post as Minister. When the cabinet of Prime Minister Ivar Asjes was formed Córdoba could have become Minister of Social Affairs, Work & Welfare. He however decided against it, as to not lose party experience in the Estates and let Jeanne-Marie Francisca become minister.

Córdoba was succeed as Vice President of the Estates on 8 December 2015 by Humphrey Davelaar. He has been political leader of Pueblo Soberano since 14 December 2015, when he succeeded Helmin Wiels. He was the sole candidate in the party elections. Córdoba became faction leader of Pueblo Soberano in the Estates on 16 December, taking over from Melvin Cijntje.

Córdoba was named Minister for Social Development, Work and Welfare in the Hensley Koeiman cabinet which was installed on 23 December 2016. He kept his position in the cabinet of Gilmar Pisas, which took office on 24 March 2017. On 29 May 2017 the Pisas cabinet was succeeded by that of Eugene Rhuggenaath. After the 2017 general election the PS obtained one seat, which is occupied by Córdoba.

References

External links
 Profile on Parliament of Curaçao

1950 births
Living people
Government ministers of Curaçao
Members of the Estates of Curaçao
Sovereign People politicians